Andrea Basso (born 8 October 1993) is an Italian tennis player.

Basso has a career high ATP singles ranking of 301 achieved on 23 April 2018. He also has a career high ATP doubles ranking of 503 achieved on 18 September 2017.

Basso made his ATP main draw debut at the 2019 Italian Open after winning the pre-qualifying wildcard tournament.

ATP Challenger and ITF Futures finals

Singles: 12 (3–9)

Soubles: 12 (9–3)

References

External links
 
 

1993 births
Living people
Italian male tennis players
Sportspeople from Genoa
21st-century Italian people